Manuel Gregorio Tavárez Ropero (November 16, 1843<ref>[http://www.enciclopediapr.org/ing/article.cfm?ref=09072202&highlight=%2BManuel%20%2BGregorio%20%2BTavarez Manuel Gregorio Tavarez.]  Encyclopedia Puerto Rico. Retrieved July 8, 2013.</ref> – July 1, 1883), was Puerto Rico's classical and danza composer. He has been called "The Chopin of America".

Early years
Tavárez was born in San Juan, Puerto Rico, the son of a French father and a Puerto Rican mother. San Juan was the city where he first began his musical studies. His first musical mentors were José Cabrizas and Domingo Delgado. Tavárez was a student of Gonzalo de J. Núñez (1850 – 1915), whose students also included the internationally known musicians and composers Juan Morel Campos and Arístides Chavier Arévalo. Tavárez became an accomplished pianist at an early age. He was able to enroll and study music in the Music Conservatory of Paris at the age of 15 with a scholarship granted by "The Economic Society of Friends of Puerto Rico" (La Sociedad Económica Amigos del Pais).  Tavárez studied under the guidance of Auber and D'Albert. While in France, Tavárez suffered a stroke which left his hand partially paralyzed.

Tavárez returned to Puerto Rico because of his health problems. He settled down in Ponce where he gave piano lessons.  He was able to overcome his health problems and began to put on musical concerts of his compositions.

"Father of the Puerto Rican Danza"
Tavárez is considered to be Puerto Rico's first Romantic era composer. He also composed music in other genres as well. Among his best known works was the funeral march Redención (Redemption), dedicated to the memory of José Campeche; the rhapsody Souvenir de Puerto Rico, and his danzas Recuerdos de Antaño (Remembrance of Yesteryear) and what is considered his greatest work, the danza Margarita. The music created by Tavárez would always be recognized as an integral part of Puerto Rican culture. Tavárez is known as the "Father of the Puerto Rican Danza". Among his most distinguished disciples was the composer Juan Morel Campos. His daughter Elisa Tavárez would also become an accomplished pianist.

Death
Manuel Gregorio Tavárez Ropero died on July 1, 1883 in the city of Ponce, Puerto Rico. He was 39 years old.

Selection of Danzas by Tavárez

The following is a list of some of Tavárez's Danzas:
La Sensitiva (The sensitive one)
La Margarita
Recuerdos de Antaño (Remembrance of Yesteryear)
Redención (Redemption)
Souvener de Puerto Rico
Un Recuerdito (A small remembrance)

Honors and recognitions
Tavárez has been honored by the Government of Puerto Rico with the naming of public buildings and institutions after him.  In San Juan, there is a theater named after him.  His music can still be appreciated in concerts today. In Ponce, he is recognized at the Ponce Park of the Illustrious Ponce Citizens.

See also

List of Puerto Ricans
French immigration to Puerto Rico

References

Revista Instituto de Cultura Puertorriqueña (in Spanish)

1843 births
1883 deaths
Puerto Rican composers
Puerto Rican male composers
Puerto Rican people of French descent
Burials at Panteón Nacional Román Baldorioty de Castro
Musicians from Ponce
Male composers
19th-century American composers
19th-century American male musicians